Vladimir Romanishin (born 27 August 1959) is a Soviet rower. He competed at the 1988 Summer Olympics and the 1992 Summer Olympics.

References

1959 births
Living people
Soviet male rowers
Olympic rowers of the Soviet Union
Olympic rowers of the Unified Team
Rowers at the 1988 Summer Olympics
Rowers at the 1992 Summer Olympics
Place of birth missing (living people)